Stalskoye (Gök-Töbe) is a rural locality (a selo) and the administrative centre of Stalsky Selsoviet, Kizilyurtovsky District, Republic of Dagestan, Russia. The population was 5,729 as of 2010. There are 63 streets.

Nationalities 
Avars, Kumyks, Laks, Lezgins and Dargins live there.

Geography 
Stalskoye is located 114 km south of Kizlyar (the district's administrative centre) by road. Shushanovka and Kulzeb are the nearest rural localities.

References 

Rural localities in Kizilyurtovsky District